HaYonim Cave is a cave located in a limestone bluff about 250 meters above modern sea level, in the Upper Galilee, Israel.

History
The site had substantial occupation during the Middle Paleolithic Mousterian period, from 250,000 years ago to 100,000 years ago, and later, during the Neolithic period and the Natufian culture around 12,000 years ago.

The Mousterian occupation of the cave included Levallois debitage and early Middle Paleolithic blade technology, as well as a series of hearths.

In Hayonim were also found wall carvings depicting symbolic shapes and animals, such a running horse dated to between 40,000-18,500 BP, possibly to the Levantine Aurignacian circa 28,000 BP, and now visible in the Israel Museum. This is considered as the first art object found within the context of the Levantine Upper Paleolithic.

The Natufian occupation of the cave featured circular rooms with prepared floors, with a thick midden of lithics, groundstone objects, and worked bone. There were several hearths, and single graves located in abandoned rooms or outside inhabited rooms.

See also

List of caves in Israel
Archaeology of Israel

References

Natufian sites
Caves of Israel
Prehistoric sites in Israel
Neanderthal sites
Upper Galilee
Mousterian
Levantine Aurignacian